This is a list of Syrian cheeses. There are numerous varieties of Syrian cheese found throughout the Levant including kenafa, surke, baladi, and tresse.

Types of cheese 
Some of the most common types of cheese from Syria are:

Ackawi 

Ackawi (also Akawi and Akawieh) is a white cheese with a complex flavor. It is an Arab Palestinian cheese originating from the Palestinian town of  Akka, today Acre, Israel (Akka in Arabic), commonly made using pasteurized cow's milk but can be made with goat or sheep's milk. It is produced on a large scale in Israel, Jordan, Syria and Palestine.

Baladi 
Baladi is a soft-white, smooth, creamy cheese with a mild flavour, usually spread on fresh bread or crackers and most often eaten for breakfast or snacks. 

Baladi is fresh, traditionally unpasteurized, and uncultured and is made with a mixture of goat, cow and sheep's milk. Its diverse microflora, high moisture, uncultured, and unpasteurized nature tend to limit shelf life to three days.

Charkassiyea 
Charkassiyea is a soft, fresh cheese.

Jibneh Arabieh 
Jibneh Arabieh (Arabic for "Arab cheese") is a simple cheese found throughout the Middle East and is particularly popular in Egypt and Eastern Arabia. The cheese has an open texture and a mild taste. 

While the product originated with Bedouins, using goat or sheep milk, current practice is to use cow's milk. Jibneh Arabieh is used for cooking, or simply as a table cheese.

Jibne Baida 
Jibne baida (Arabic for "white cheese") is a hard white cheese with a pronounced salty taste, often boiled before eating.

Kenafa 
Kenafa is an unsalted, very fresh, soft cheese that melts easily. It is used to make the popular cheesecake-like dessert that is sometimes called Kenafa, mainly in Palestine and Egypt. It can also be used as a base for other sweet-cheese desserts. 

It is sold frozen because there is no salt in it (limiting shelf life) and is available in both retail and bulk packages.

Majdoule 
Majdoule is a salty white string cheese made up of thick strands braided together (hence the name).

Shelal 
Shelal is a salty white string cheese made up of strands woven together.

Surke 
Surke, also called sorke or shanklish, is a mature cheese made with spices and generally presented as balls covered in za'tar orchile powder; most often eaten as a starter dish with tomato, oil and sometimes onion.

Tresse cheese 
Tresse cheese, also known by its Arabic name Jibneh mshallaleh is a form of string cheese originating in Syria.

Turkomani 
Turkomani is a soft porous cheese with a delicate flavor.

Other milk products

Kashta 
Kastha (or Kishta) is a heavy cream that is very popular in the Middle East. Traditionally, it is made by skimming the thickest part of the cream from whey. The product is used both as an ingredient in cooking and is mixed with honey to be eaten as a very rich dessert. It has a 60-day refrigerated shelf life.

References

Arab cuisine
Levantine cuisine
Mediterranean cuisine
Middle Eastern cheeses
Cheese